Streptomyces eurocidicus is a bacterium species from the genus of Streptomyces. Streptomyces eurocidicus produces azomycin, eurocidin C, eurocidin D, eurocidin E, tertiomycine A, 2-nitroimidazole and tertiomycine B.

Further reading

See also 
 List of Streptomyces species

References

External links
 Type strain of Streptomyces eurocidicus at BacDive -  the Bacterial Diversity Metadatabase

eurocidicus
Bacteria described in 1991